Jean Jullien may refer to 

Jean Jullien (designer) (born 1983), French graphic designer
Adolphe Jullien (Jean Lucien Adolphe Jullien; 1845–1932), French journalist and musicologist 
Jean Julien Angot des Rotours (1778–1844), French colonial governor

See also
 Jean-Julien